Gerrit Thomas Ferreira also known as GT Ferreira is a South African billionaire businessman, investor and banker who is one of the founders of FirstRand Limited.

Biography

Gerrit Ferreira got his MBA degree from University of Stellenbosch. In 1977, he co-founded FirstRand's predecessor, Rand Consolidated Investing along with Paul Harris and Lauritz Dippenaar. Previously, he served as MD of RMB Holdings between 1985–88.

References

1948 births
Living people
Afrikaner people
South African businesspeople